Borgonovo Val Tidone (or ) is a comune (municipality) in the Province of Piacenza in the Italian region Emilia-Romagna, located about  northwest of Bologna and about  west of Piacenza.

Borgonovo Val Tidone borders the following municipalities: Agazzano, Alta Val Tidone, Castel San Giovanni, Gragnano Trebbiense, Pianello Val Tidone, Rottofreno, Sarmato, Ziano Piacentino.

The frazione of Bilegno was the birthplace of the  luthier Giovambattista Guadagnini. The town was founded in 1196 by the commune of Piacenza as a fortified outpost with a rectangular plan. This Rocca is now the town hall.

People
Francesco Alberoni (born 1929),  sociologist and journalist 
Matteo Corradini (born 1975), writer
Flaviano Labò (1927–1991), operatic tenor
Mario Morini (born May 1940), hospitality entrepreneur
Fabio Paratici (born July 13, 1972), managing director of football, Tottenham Hotspur FC

International relations

Twin towns — Sister cities

Borgonovo Val Tidone is twinned with:
 Dunellen, New Jersey, United States

References

External links
 Official website

Cities and towns in Emilia-Romagna